Manilkara gonavensis is a tree species in the sapodilla family, found nowhere else but Haiti. It has only ever been collected one time for study, when the type specimen was taken. This was in the early 20th century, before 1929, which is the year it was described (the year of a plant's collection often predates its description by years, sometimes even decades). Consequently, very little is known about M. gonavensis, and further study is needed. The specimen was taken from Haiti's Gonâve Island, which is reflected in the choice of its specific epithet.

Sources

gonavensis
Plants described in 1929
Critically endangered plants
Endemic flora of Haiti
Taxonomy articles created by Polbot